Family Channel (commonly known as Family) is a Canadian English-language discretionary specialty channel owned by WildBrain. The network primarily airs children's television series, teen dramas, as well as other programming targeting a family audience. Family Channel is headquartered in the Brookfield Place office complex, near the Financial District of Downtown Toronto. It has transmitted from Corus Quay since at least 2014.

Launched on September 1, 1988, it was originally a joint venture between the owners of the premium television services First Choice and Superchannel; due to the breakup of Western International Communications, the network became a joint venture between Astral Media and Corus Entertainment. Astral later acquired full ownership of the network; after the 2013 acquisition of Astral by Bell Media, the network and its sister channels were divested to DHX Media (now WildBrain) in 2014.

Family was originally licensed as a premium specialty service, which necessitated that it operate under a commercial-free format, but allowed it to operate multiplex feeds. Nevertheless, television providers typically distributed Family as a conventional specialty channel. In 2016, Family was relieved of this mandate after the CRTC transitioned premium specialty services to the standardized discretionary service license.

From its launch in 1988 until 2015, many of Family Channel's programming format mirrored that of the American premium service Disney Channel. Family Channel's programming lineup consisted mainly of domestic and foreign-imported live-action and animated series from Disney Channel, feature films from the Disney film library, classic films from other Canadian and American film studios, and specials, while also using this partnership to launch Canadian versions of Disney Junior and Disney XD. This partnership ended in 2015, when Disney entered into a new licensing agreement with Corus and launched a Canadian version of Disney Channel and, later, Disney XD and Disney Junior. Since then, Family Channel has acquired programming from other sources.

As of March 2013, Family Channel is available to approximately six million pay television households in Canada. It broadcasts Eastern Time Zone feeds in both standard definition and high definition, and a Pacific Time Zone feed solely in standard definition.

History

Early history

Family Channel was licensed as a premium television service by the Canadian Radio-television and Telecommunications Commission (CRTC) on December 1, 1987; it was originally operated as a joint venture between Allarcom Pay Television Limited and First Choice Canadian Communications Corporation (owners of both Superchannel and First Choice), with both companies owning a 50% stake in the service.

In October 1999, as part of the break-up of Western International Communications (which had bought Allarcom), its stake in Family Channel was sold to Corus Entertainment. In March 2001, in response to concerns from the CRTC over its near-monopoly on the ownership of children's specialty channels in Canada (citing YTV, Treehouse, and Teletoon), Corus sold its stake in Family Channel to Astral Media in return for Astral's Stake in The Comedy Network for $126.9 million, giving them full ownership and making it a sister channel to The Movie Network, which is now called Crave.

On July 1, 2007, Family became the last English language children's network in Canada to switch to a 24-hour broadcast schedule. On January 11, 2011, Family launched a high-definition feed, and concurrently introduced an updated logo and on-air presentation.

Sale to DHX Media
On March 4, 2013, following the Competition Bureau's approval of Bell Media's acquisition of Astral Media, Bell announced that it would divest Family and its sister networks, as well as Astral's seven radio stations and French language music channels MusiquePlus and MusiMax, in an attempt to relieve concerns surrounding Bell's total market share in English language television following the merger. Bell's original proposal, under which it would have maintained ownership of the channels, was rejected by the Bureau in 2012 as it would have given Bell a 42% share of the English television market. Bell filed a new application for the proposed takeover with the Canadian Radio-television and Telecommunications Commission on March 6, 2013; the CRTC approved the merger on June 27, 2013, with Family Channel and the other Astral channels that were put up for sale concurrently being placed in a blind trust held by businessman and former Montreal Canadiens president Pierre Boivin, pending their sale to a third-party.

On November 28, 2013, DHX Media announced that it would acquire Family and its sister networks for $170 million. While the Halifax-based company already distributes and produces a large library of children's television series (particularly through its 2012 purchase of the Cookie Jar Entertainment, which gave it ownership of the program libraries of Cinar and DIC Entertainment), the purchase marks DHX's first foray into broadcasting. DHX has indicated that it would leverage its resources and library to add more original, Canadian-produced programming to Family under its ownership.

The acquisition of Family Channel and its sister networks by DHX was approved by the CRTC on July 24, 2014. Under DHX ownership, the network is subject to new licensing conditions which require that at least 60% of the Canadian programming broadcast by the network on an annual basis be produced by companies other than DHX. The acquisition was finalized on July 31, 2014, with Family and its sister networks becoming part of a newly formed division of the company known as DHX Television.

Loss of Disney Channel programming rights and other changes
On April 16, 2015, it was announced that Corus Entertainment had acquired Canadian rights to Disney Channel's programming library, and that it would launch a Canadian version of Disney Channel in September 2015. DHX's programming agreement with Disney would end in January 2016. As a result of these changes, Disney programming was phased out of Family Channel's lineup throughout the remainder of 2015, and its sister Disney Junior and Disney XD-branded networks were rebranded as Family Jr., Télémagino, and Family Chrgd. Corus would also launch new Disney Junior and Disney XD channels on December 1, 2015.

Alongside new and original productions, DHX reached new output deals with AwesomenessTV, DreamWorks Animation, and Mattel in 2015 for programming based on their properties across its networks.

On June 9, 2015, it was announced that a new incarnation of the Degrassi franchise, Degrassi: Next Class, would premiere on Family in 2016. The show is produced by Epitome Pictures, a studio DHX acquired in 2014. Next Class premiered on January 4, 2016 as part of a new primetime block known as "F2N". The F2N block was positioned towards an older teenage audience than the "tween" audience that Family has typically targeted; DHX Television senior vice-president Joe Tedesco explained that the company had original series in development for Family in case it ever did lose its output deal with Disney, and that these decisions were based on a goal to build a "strong lineup" of programs, and was not financially motivated. Tedesco went on to explain that the F2N block was meant to create a "meaningful destination" for teens and, in the case of Degrassi—a series that has historically dealt with teen issues, encourage family viewing.

As part of the CRTC's "Let's Talk TV" initiative, DHX Media expressed concern that the elimination of genre protection for Category A specialty channels would put services licensed as premium services at an unfair disadvantage, especially due to their inability to air advertising. On November 2, 2016, the CRTC approved the implementation of new categories for licensed television services, replacing the separate specialty and pay television categories with a single Discretionary service category using standardized conditions of license, and ruled that current premium services may operate under these deregulated policies effective immediately. This decision allowed Family Channel to begin operating under an advertising-supported format. Tedesco commended the CRTC for the decision, stating that it "represents the next logical step in the implementation of the Let's Talk TV decision, when genre protection was eliminated, and it ensures that pay and specialty channels will now be on a level field."

Programming

Family's  programming is aimed towards preteens to teenagers ages 8–19 and encompasses original and acquired children's television series, teen dramas, sitcoms, and both theatrically released and made-for-television movies. Its daytime lineup is aimed at preteens and young teenagers, while its primetime programs are aimed at an older teenage and family audience. The channel airs films on Friday and Saturday evenings and on weekend afternoons.

As previously mandated for premium services, Family, historically, did not air traditional commercial advertising, besides promotions in between (or sometimes during) programs for its own programming and sponsored contests, along with interstitial segments such as Fam Jam (which aired teen pop music videos), and features on upcoming family-targeting films produced by former sister The Movie Network, who is now tied to the other Bell Media movie channels. After changes in CRTC policies and the network's licensing in November 2016, Family switched to a conventional, commercial-supported format for its non-preschool programs.

Historically, Family and its spin-offs had been the main Canadian outlets for programming from the U.S Disney Channel and its sibling brands; Disney Junior and Disney XD. The channel also co-produced the 2010 film 16 Wishes, in association with Disney Channel and MarVista Entertainment. Family would began to phase out Disney programming in late 2015, after Corus Entertainment acquired exclusive rights to Disney Channel and its associated brands in Canada. Since then, Family acquired the bulk of its programming from AwesomenessTV and DreamWorks Animation, as well as other syndicated and off-network programming targeting a family audience.

Family has also co-commissioned programming with the U.S. network Universal Kids, owned by DreamWorks' parent company NBCUniversal, which had previously acquired the rights to the Family original series The Next Step and provided additional funding for its sixth season due to reduced financial commitments by DHX. Family also co-commissioned the children's horror anthology Creeped Out with British children's channel CBBC.

Notable Programming blocks

Former
 Disney Junior on Family – "Disney Junior on Family" was Family Channel's version of the United States programming block and cable channel of the same name featuring shows targeted at children aged 2–7, that aired Monday through Fridays from 4:30 a.m. to 7:00 a.m. and 8:45 a.m. to 11:00 a.m., and weekend mornings from 4:30 a.m. to 8:00 a.m. EST. The block, which began in 2003 as "Family Playhouse Fun", then in February 2009 as "Family Junior", and later "Playhouse Disney" on December 6, 2010 before being renamed "Disney Junior" on May 6, 2011 as part of a rebranding of Playhouse Disney's program blocks and standalone channels around the world to the Disney Junior brand, primarily targeted preschoolers as Family's usual target audience of older children and teenagers are in school at that time. 
Jetix – A Canadian version of the U.S programming block seen on ABC Family and Toon Disney. Jetix launched on September 10, 2006, replacing "Power Box". 
 F2N – Launched January 4, 2016, this primetime block was aimed at an older teenage audience, anchored by Degrassi: Next Class and eight series acquisitions from AwesomenessTV. This teen block aired every night starting at 9:00 p.m. EST. It was discontinued in September 2017.

Related services

Family Jr. and Télémagino

On November 30, 2007, Family launched Playhouse Disney Channel, a separate channel featuring programming aimed at a preschool audience, based on Disney's Playhouse Disney brand. Subject to carriage, the multiplex channel was made available at no additional charge to television providers and subscribers who receive its parent network. It was rebranded as Disney Junior on May 6, 2011, following the launch of the brand in the United States earlier that year. On September 18, 2015, due to Corus Entertainment's acquisition of rights to Disney's children's programming and brands, the channel was re-branded as Family Jr.

As Family was licensed as a premium service, it is allowed to operate multiplex channels that carry additional programming consistent with its licensing and nature of service.

A French-language version of the channel, now known as Télémagino, was launched on July 5, 2010 as Playhouse Disney Télé. Unlike Family Jr., Télémagino operates under a separate Category B license.

WildBrainTV

On June 1, 2011, Family launched a Canadian version of Disney XD under a separate license. It re-branded as Family Chrgd on October 9, 2015. It was renamed once more to WildBrainTV on March 1, 2022.

Other services
 Radio Disney – In October 2011, Family Channel began offering a live audio stream of U.S. children's music network Radio Disney through Family.ca. However, in May 2015, due to Family losing Disney rights, Radio Disney was shut down.

References

External links
 

WildBrain
English-language television stations in Canada
Commercial-free television networks
Television channels and stations established in 1988
Analog cable television networks in Canada
Former Corus Entertainment networks
1988 establishments in Canada